The 2020–21 F.C. Paços de Ferreira season was F.C. Paços de Ferreira's second consecutive season in top-division of the Portuguese football league, the Primeira Liga, and the 70th as a football club.

Players

First-team squad

Out on loan

Pre-season and friendlies

Competitions

Overview

Primeira Liga

League table

Results summary

Results by round

Matches
The league fixtures were announced on 28 August 2020.

Taça de Portugal

Taça da Liga

Notes

References

F.C. Paços de Ferreira seasons
Paços de Ferreira